Geely MK is a subcompact sedan and hatchback produced by Chinese auto maker Geely.

Overview 
Several versions were done and branded differently among Geely's former sub-brands. The Geely Jingang is still available for purchase as of 2020 where pricing ranges from 45.900 yuan to 62.900 yuan (6,490 to 8,890 USD - April 2020 exchange rate). Trim levels are known as: Aggressive, Elite, Integrated Sunroof and Distinguished.

Styling 
The Geely MK subcompact sedan was criticized for resembling the first generation Toyota Vios especially from the side as the DLO is essentially the same as the Toyota subcompact sedan. Despite the redesigned front and rear and also having a hatchback version, it doesn't hide the fact that during the development of the Geely MK sedan, reverse engineering was involved using the Toyota Vios. The MK also resembles a Opel Astra H from the front and rear.

2016 facelift
The last facelift was conducted in late 2015 for the 2016 model year, changing the front and rear views and clarifying the updated model name and branding simply as the Geely Jingang under the Geely brand.

Geely Englon SC6-RV
The Geely Englon SC6-RV debuted as a concept at the 2010 Beijing Auto Show and started production in 2012. The Englon SC6-RV is based on the post-facelift Geely Golden Eagle Cross (Jinying cross), which are both crossover hatchback versions of the Geely MK which was also known as the Geely Jinying.

Geely Englon SC6
Based on the Geely MK sedan, the Geely Englon SC6 originally revealed as a concept in 2011. The production version debuted at the Beijing Auto Show in April 2012. Three engines were available including a 1.3L, a 1.5L and a 1.8L mated to a six-speed tiptronic gearbox. Price ranges from 53.800 yuan to 60.800 yuan.

References

External links
Official website 

CK
Cars introduced in 2006
Cars of China
Front-wheel-drive vehicles
Subcompact cars
Sedans
hatchbacks